CIW has multiple meanings:

 California Institution for Women, a state prison in the USA
 Canadian Index of Wellbeing, that measures the wellbeing of Canadians over time
 Carnegie Institution of Washington
 Chicago and Illinois Western Railroad
 Central Indiana and Western Railroad
 Certified Internet Web Professional
 Coalition of Immokalee Workers
 Computational Intensive Workload
 ISO 639 language designation for Southwestern dialect of the Anishinaabe language, often called the "Chippewa language."
 Close-in weapon system

See also
  Crime intelligence and wing